Armbouts-Cappel (from ) is a commune in the Nord department in northern France.

It is 7 kilometers south of the centre of Dunkirk.

Population

Heraldry

See also
Communes of the Nord department

References

Communes of Nord (French department)
French Flanders